Senjeduiyeh may refer to:
 Senjeduiyeh, Shahr-e Babak, Kerman Province